Jorma Kuisma (born c. 1947) was a Canadian football player who played for the Montreal Alouettes. He won the Grey Cup with them in 1970. He previously played college football at California State University, Northridge (then known as San Fernando Valley State College).

References

1940s births
Living people
Montreal Alouettes players
Cal State Northridge Matadors football players
Canadian football linebackers